DXLL (94.7 FM), broadcasting as 94.7 Power Radio, is a radio station owned by Rizal Memorial Colleges Broadcasting Corporation and operated by Christian Media Management, a subsidiary of Laforteza Group of Companies. The station's studio and transmitter are located along Broadcast Ave., Shrine Hills, Matina, Davao City.

History
The station was established in 1995 as Mellow Touch 94.7 under the ownership of FBS Radio Network. The station closed in late 2006 due to poor management that led to bankruptcy. In June 2007, the station was re-opened under new management of J-TvR Tri-Media Services. It only managed DXLL for only a year due to conflict with lease contract. FBS took back the station and re-leased it to JKZ Adz Services in June 2008. Since that time, Ateneo de Davao University airs a weekday morning block called Blue Knights FM.

In January 2010, FBS took over the management of DXLL after another event of conflicts with its blocktime partner. It relocated to Midland Village in Ma-a. The station maintained the format of easy listen music and added some talk programs to gain more listeners.

In May 2014, RMC Broadcasting acquired the station and rebranded it as 94.7 One Radio with a news and music format. It transferred its studios to Door 1C, Anda Corporate Center along F. Inigo St. On December 2, the station, along with DXRA and most of Radyo ni Juan stations, went off the air due to financial problems.

By the end of January 2021, the station went back on air, this time as 94.7 Power Radio. It relocated to its transmitter site in Shrine Hills.

References

Radio stations in Davao City
Radio stations established in 1995